Eurytides epidaus, the Mexican kite swallowtail or long-tailed kite swallowtail, is a butterfly of the family Papilionidae. It is found in Mexico and Central America.

The wingspan is 40–45 mm.

The larvae feed on Annona reticulata and Rollinia species

Subspecies
There are three recognised subspecies:
Eurytides epidaus epidaus (southern Mexico (Tamaulipas, Puebla, Veracruz, Tabasco, Yucatán, Quintana Roo, N. Oaxaca, N. Chiapas), Belize, Guatemala, El Salvador, Honduras, Nicaragua, Costa Rica)
Eurytides epidaus tepicus (Rothschild & Jordan, 1906) western Mexico: Sinaloa, Nayarit, Jalisco, Colima)
Eurytides epidaus fenochionis (Salvin & Godman, 1868) (south-western Mexico: Michoacán, Guerrero, Morelos, Oaxaca, S. Veracruz, Chiapas)

References

Further reading

Edwin Möhn, 2002 Schmetterlinge der Erde, Butterflies of the world Part XIIII (14), Papilionidae VIII: Baronia, Euryades, Protographium, Neographium, Eurytides. Edited by Erich Bauer and Thomas Frankenbach Keltern: Goecke & Evers; Canterbury : Hillside Books.  All species and subspecies are included, also most of the forms. Several females are shown the first time in colour.

Eurytides
Butterflies of North America
Butterflies of Central America
Butterflies described in 1846